Northern Buskerud Police District was one of 27 police districts in Norway, covering the northern part of Buskerud. The district is headquartered in Hønefoss and consists of one police stations and ten sheriff's offices. The district is led by Chief of Police Sissel Hammer. Specifically the police district covers the municipalities of Ringerike, Hole, Flå, Nes, Gol, Hemsedal, Ål, Hol, Sigdal, Krødsherad, Modum, Nore og Uvdal plus Jevnaker in Oppland. As of 2011 the district had 184 employees.

References

Police districts in Norway
Organisations based in Ringerike (municipality)
Hønefoss
2003 establishments in Norway